The UMass Minutemen soccer team is a varsity intercollegiate athletic team of University of Massachusetts Amherst in Amherst, Massachusetts, United States. The team is a member of the Atlantic 10 Conference, which is part of the National Collegiate Athletic Association's Division I. UMass' first men's soccer team was fielded in 1930. The team plays its home games at Rudd Field. The Minutemen are coached by Fran O'Leary.

Seasons 

Source: 1930–2021 season.

NCAA tournament results 

UMass has appeared in five NCAA tournaments.

Coaching history

Individual achievements

All-Americans 

UMass has produced 17 All-Americans, won by 15 different individuals. The most recent All-American came in 2017.

References

External links 
 

 
Soccer clubs in Massachusetts
1930 establishments in Massachusetts
Association football clubs established in 1930